Ranitomeya vanzolinii, also known as the Brazilian poison frog or spotted poison frog, is a species of frog from the family Dendrobatidae. It is found in the Amazonian rainforests of Brazil and Peru, and possibly Bolivia.

Etymology
The specific name vanzolinii honors Paulo Vanzolini, a Brazilian herpetologist and composer.

Description
Adults of this species grow to between  snout–vent length and feed on a variety of tiny invertebrates.
During the breeding season males have loud trill-like call. Unlike many species of dendrobatids the parents of Ranitomeya vanzolinii offspring return to feed their young. They will lay their fertile egg in an isolated pool. A bromeliad which has filled with water is an ideal place. Once the tadpole hatches the female encouraged by the male will lay an infertile egg into the small pool, this provides the tadpole with a food source until it can fend for itself. The parents form a stable pair during this period.

Habitat and conservation
The species' natural habitats are pre-montane cloud forests and lowland rainforests. Adults are primarily arboreal, mostly found up to 2 metres above ground, occasionally higher.

Populations have probably declined in recent years. It is locally threatened by habitat loss and illegal pet trade.

References

vanzolinii
Amphibians described in 1982
Amphibians of Brazil
Amphibians of Peru
Taxonomy articles created by Polbot